Reggie Brown (born June 26, 1973) is a former professional American football fullback for the Seattle Seahawks. He was selected in the third round with the 91st overall pick of the 1996 NFL Draft by the Seahawks. He appeared in 61 games over 5 seasons, including 10 starts.

References

1973 births
Living people
People from Highland Park, Michigan
Players of American football from Michigan
American football fullbacks
Fresno State Bulldogs football players
Seattle Seahawks players
Henry Ford High School (Detroit, Michigan) alumni